The 357th Airlift Squadron is a Tactical Airlift unit of the United States Air Force assigned to the Air Force Reserve Command and part of the 908th Airlift Wing at Maxwell Air Force Base, Alabama. It operates Lockheed C-130H Hercules aircraft providing global airlift. The 357th AS operates (8) C-130H2 aircraft that were built in the 1990s, which utilize Flight Engineers and Navigators, along with the crew complement of Pilots and Loadmasters.

The 908th Airlift Wing contributes the US' defense by providing airlift and related services through the dedicated efforts of more than 1,200 Reservists and eight C-130 Hercules aircraft. Unit Reservists fly approximately 1 million miles annually engaging in training operations and supporting real-world missions. The 908th Airlift Wing, home based at historic Maxwell-Gunter AFB in Montgomery, Ala., is the state's only Air Force Reserve unit. The day-to-day operations of the 908th are handled by a group of approximately 175 civil servants known as Air Reserve Technicians who also serve as Reservists, and a small number of civilian employees who do not have Reserve status.

History

World War II
Constituted as 357 Bombardment Squadron (Heavy) on 28 January 1942. Activated on 1 June 1942 as a Consolidated B-24 Liberator Operational Training Unit, later becoming a Replacement Training Unit (RTU) for deployed combat units, assigned to II Bomber Command. Inactivated on 10 April 1944.

Redesignated as a Boeing B-29 Superfortress very heavy bombardment Squadron under Second Air Force on 1 April 1944 at Dalhart Army Air Field, Texas.  Initially equipped with Boeing B-17 Flying Fortresses for training, due to shortage of Superfortresses.    Moved to McCook Army Air Field, Nebraska in August 1944 and equipped with B-29B limited production aircraft.

After completion of training deployed to Central Pacific Area, assigned to XXI Bomber Command at Northwest Field (Guam) for operational missions.  B-29Bs were standard production aircraft stripped of most defensive guns to increase speed and bomb load, The tail gun was aimed and fired automatically by the new AN/APG-15B radar fire control system that detected the approaching enemy plane and made all the necessary calculations.

Mission of the squadron was the strategic bombardment of the Japanese Home Islands.  Entered combat on 16 June 1945 with a bombing raid against an airfield on Moen. Flew first mission against the Japanese home islands on 26 June 1945 and afterwards operated principally against the enemy's petroleum industry.  Flew primarily low-level, fast attacks at night using a mixture of high-explosive and incendary bombs to attack targets.

Flew last combat mission on 15 August 1945, later flew in "show of Force" mission on 2 September 1945 over Tokyo Bay during formal Japanese Surrender. Inactivated on Guam 15 April 1946, personnel returned to the United States and aircraft sent to storage in Southwest United States.  It was credited with participating in the Air Offensive, Japan; Eastern Mandates, and Western Pacific campaigns.  The squadron received the Distinguished Unit Citation: Japan, 22–29 July 1945.

Reserve Operations
It trained for troop carrier missions from 1952 to 1967.  The squadron airlifted troops and their equipment during the Cuban Missile Crisis, October–November 1962. Redesignated 357 Tactical Airlift Squadron on 1 Jul 1967; 357 Tactical Air Support Squadron on 25 Apr 1969; 357 Tactical Airlift Squadron on 15 Dec 1971 and Redesignated 357 Airlift Squadron on 1 Feb 1992. During 1993, the squadron exchanged their C-7 for C-130 Hercules'.

C-7 “Caribou”

357th TAS & 700th TAS (AFRES)
The 94th Tactical Airlift Wing was the Wing over command of the 908th Tactical Airlift Group which had the 357th and 700th Tactical Airlift Sqs. The 357th TAS and 700th TAS were sister Squadrons, each unit had 16 Bou's. The Role of the units was Tactical Airlift. They were the only two AF Reserve Units with C-7's.
The 357th TAS was stationed at Maxwell AFB - Montgomery, AL and was later moved to a Tactical Airlift Wing. The 357th was the last Reserve unit to fly the C-7's from 1972 to 1983.
The 700th TAS was stationed at Dobbins AFB -  Marietta, GA and flew C-7's from 1972 to 1982.
Some of the 94th Caribou Aircraft were sold to the Spanish Government after the C-7's left the 94th at Dobbins.(Thanks to Kenneth Perry of Air Force Aviation Heritage Foundation)

C-130 “Hercules”

The squadron has flown numerous, worldwide airlift missions, including missions in the Gulf War and the Bosnian relief effort. More recently, it has deployed for operations in Southwest Asia for Iraqi Freedom, New Dawn, Inherent Resolve & Freedom Sentinel.  These operations provided tactical airlift and airdrop in Iraq and Afghanistan.

It was awarded the Air Force Outstanding Unit Awards: 1 July 1972 – 15 March 1974; 1 January 1976 – 30 November 1977; 1 February 1980 – 31 January 1982; 1 September 1986 – 31 August 1988; 1 September 1991 – 31 August 1993.

Future Operations 

In November 2020 the United States Air Force announced that the MH-139A "Grey Wolf" Formal Training Unit (FTU)  will be placed at Maxwell Air Force Base, AL. This is following news in 2019 that Air Force Reserve Command announced that the (8) C-130H aircraft of the 908th Airlift Wing/ 357th Airlift Squadron would be retired with the follow-on mission coinciding with the active duty MH-139A unit.

Lineage
 Constituted as the 357th Bombardment Squadron (Heavy) on 28 January 1942
 Activated on 1 June 1942
 Inactivated on 10 April 1944
 Redesignated 357th Bombardment Squadron, Very Heavy on 27 June 1944
 Activated on 7 July 1944
 Inactivated on 15 April 1946
 Redesignated 357th Troop Carrier Squadron, Medium on 26 May 1952
 Activated in the reserve on 14 June 1952
 Ordered to active duty on 28 October 1962
 Relieved from active duty on 28 November 1962
 Redesignated 357th Tactical Airlift Squadron on 1 July 1967
 Redesignated 357th Tactical Air Support Squadron on 25 April 1969
 Redesignated 357th Tactical Airlift Squadron on 15 December 1971
 Redesignated 357th Airlift Squadron on 1 February 1992

Assignments
 302d Bombardment Group, 1 June 1942 – 10 April 1944
 331st Bombardment Group, 7 July 1944 – 15 April 1946
 302d Troop Carrier Group, 14 June 1952
 445th Troop Carrier Group, 16 November 1957
 446th Troop Carrier Group, 25 March 1958
 446th Troop Carrier Wing, 14 April 1959
 302d Troop Carrier Wing, 8 May 1961
 908th Troop Carrier Group (later 908 Tactical Airlift Group, 908 Tactical Air Support Group, 908th Tactical Airlift Group, 908 Airlift Group), 11 February 1963
 908th Operations Group, 1 August 1992 – present

Stations

 Geiger Field, Washington, 1 June 1942
 Davis–Monthan Field, Arizona, 23 June 1942
 Wendover Field, Utah, 30 July 1942
 Pueblo Army Air Base, Colorado, 30 September 1942
 Davis–Monthan Field, Arizona, 1 December 1942
 Clovis Army Air Field, New Mexico, 29 January 1943
 Langley Field, Virginia, 17 December 1943
 Chatham Army Air Field, Georgia, 27 January-10 April 1944
 Dalhart Army Air Field, Texas, 7 July 1944

 McCook Army Airfield, Nebraska, 22 November 1944 – 8 April 1945
 Northwest Field, Guam, Mariana Islands, 12 May 1945 – 15 April 1946
 Clinton County Air Force Base, Ohio, 14 June 1952
 Donaldson Air Force Base, South Carolina, 16 November 1957
 New Orleans Naval Air Station, Louisiana, 25 March 1958
 Bates Field, Alabama, 8 May 1961
 Brookley Air Force Base, Alabama, 1 October 1964
 Maxwell Air Force Base, Alabama, 25 April 1969 – present

Aircraft

 Consolidated B-24 Liberator (1942–1944)
 Boeing B-17 Flying Fortress (1944)
 Boeing B-29 Superfortress (1945–1946)
 Curtiss C-46 Commando (1952–1957)
 Fairchild C-119 Flying Boxcar (1956–1969)
 Cessna U-3 Blue Canoe (1969–1970)
 Cessna O-2 Skymaster (1970–1971)
 de Havilland Canada C-7 Caribou (1971–1983)
 Lockheed C-130 Hercules (1983 – present)

References

Notes

Bibliography

 
 
 
 

0357
Military units and formations in Alabama